Rüppell's parrot (Poicephalus rueppellii) or Rueppell's parrot, is a bird that is endemic to southwestern Africa from central Namibia to southwest Angola. It lives in savanna where there are trees or in dry woodland. It is more common near streams or rivers. The name commemorates the German naturalist and explorer Eduard Rüppell.

Description

Rüppell's parrot is 22–25 cm (9 in) long and weighs 121–156 g. It has an overall dark brown color and its head is dark greyish. Both adult male and female birds have some yellow feathers on the leading edge of the wings, and yellow feathers covering their upper legs; in immature birds, the yellow is dull or missing. They are sexually dimorphic; adult female birds have blue feathers on the lower back and the rump, whilst male birds lose this blue feather coloration as they become mature.

Diet
The Ruppell's Parrot eats mainly seeds, flowers, leaves, anthropods, and bark. It has been found that during the rainy seasons they prefer to eat flowers and insects. Consistently they eat Terminalia pruniodies (T. pruniodies) and occasionally they also eat fruit, preferring softer more tender ones.

Breeding
The Rüppell's parrot nests in tree cavities. The eggs are white and there are usually three or four in a clutch. The female incubates the eggs for about 28 days and the chicks leave the nest about 68 days after hatching.

Status
It is a protected species, listed on CITES appendix II.

References

 del Hoyo, J., et al., eds. (1997). Handbook of the Birds of the World 4: 415. Lynx Edicions.
Photograph on CITES website
Richard G. Selman, Mike R. Perrin, Margaret L. Hunter & W.R.J. Dean (2002) The feeding ecology of Rüppell's Parrot, Poicephalus rueppellii, in the Waterberg, Namibia, Ostrich, 73:3-4, 127–134, DOI: 10.1080/00306525.2002.11446741

External links
 Rüppell's parrot – Species text in The Atlas of Southern African Birds.

Rüppell's parrot
Birds of Southern Africa
Rüppell's parrot
Rüppell's parrot